The 2020–21 season was Dundee's second season in the second tier of Scottish football since their relegation at the end of the 2018–19 season.

Due to the disruption caused by the COVID-19 pandemic, the teams in the Scottish Championship agreed to shorten the season to 27 games rather than the regular 36, with a start date on 17 October 2020.
Dundee will also compete in the League Cup and the Scottish Cup. The club was also set to compete in the Challenge Cup, but the tournament was cancelled due to the financial strain of the ongoing pandemic.

Dundee would earn promotion after winning the Premiership play-offs, defeating both Raith Rovers and Kilmarnock over two legs to return to the Scottish Premiership after a two-year absence.

Season summary

Pre-season 
In the wake of the uncertainty brought on by the COVID-19 pandemic, Dundee would furlough its players and staff, but ensure they would receive their usual salaries. The financial strain caused by the pandemic led to the club needing to cut costs, initially confirming the departure of assistant manager Jimmy Nicholl and asking the players to take wage cuts of up to 30 per cent in June 2020. After discussions lasting several weeks, 12 of the 13 players asked to take cuts agreed, with striker Kane Hemmings the only one to hold out longer. Despite initially agreeing to the wage cut as well, Hemmings decided to renege and leave the club in August. Later that month, Dundee would make cuts to their Youth Academy coaching staff, though the majority of coaches would continue their roles in a voluntary capacity. The club would also appoint former player and first-team coach Dave Mackay as assistant manager.

Dundee would bring in several new players, most notably Dundee-born and ex-Premier League player Charlie Adam, who supported the club as a boy and described signing for the club as a "dream".

October 
Dundee were set to play their first competitive game of the season in the League Cup at home to Forfar Athletic, but the game was called off and Dundee were awarded a 3–0 win by the SPFL following a Forfar player testing positive for COVID-19. They would begin their competitive campaign four days later, in an away win to Highland League champions Brora Rangers. The following week, Dundee would play their first league game of the season away to the recently relegated Heart of Midlothian in a highly anticipated opening game, described by the media as a 'grudge match' after the voting fiasco which marred the end of the previous season, in which a controversial Dundee vote ended the season in March and would lead to Hearts' relegation. In a turbulent game, Dundee would be completely outmatched in a 6–2 thrashing at Tynecastle. After this evisceration, Dundee would pick themselves up and get a much-needed win the following week at home to Greenock Morton, with loanee Jonathan Afolabi scoring his first competitive goal for the club in the 1–0 win. The Dark Blues looked set to repeat this result the following week against newly-promoted Raith Rovers through Charlie Adam's strike, but a late equaliser denied them from taking another 3 points.

November 
Dundee would again struggle away from home, needing inspiration from Adam to score two late goals against part-time Alloa Athletic in order to escape Recreation Park with a point in a wild 3–3 draw. Two days later, midfielder Graham Dorrans would leave the side and move to Australia to play with Western Sydney Wanderers. Returning to League Cup action, Dundee would win comfortably against Scottish League One side Cove Rangers. Despite equalling high-flying Premiership side Hibernian for most of their final group stage game, a late flurry from the Hibees would result in a heavy 4–1 defeat, though Dundee would still qualify for the following round of the cup. Dundee would coincidentally have to play Hibs away once again after drawing them in the next round. Before that, Dundee would return to league action, but would severely disappoint with an awful start in a defeat at Somerset Park against Ayr United. In their League Cup rematch against Hibs at Easter Road, Dundee would fall to their third consecutive defeat in a close 1–0 loss that would knock them out.

December 
In their first home league game in over a month, Dundee would return to winning ways with another tight 1–0 victory against Arbroath through a Paul McGowan solo goal. In a back-and-forth affair at Caledonian Stadium the following week, they would earn a point through a late Jordan McGhee equaliser. Dundee looked to have swept past high-flying league rivals Dunfermline Athletic with a dominant 3–0 lead late on, but a quick collapse allowed the Pars to snatch an unlikely point at Dens Park. Despite the prior week's disappointment, the side put it aside and would record a comfortable Boxing Day win away to Queen of the South through an Osman Sow hat-trick. The Dee would record another three goals and a win three days later at home to Alloa, with Sow scoring a brace to make it 6 goals for him in 3 games and bringing them up to third place in the league.

January 
Dundee would gain a measure of revenge over their opening day humiliation against Hearts with a commanding 3–1 win at Dens, scoring 3 goals in 4 consecutive games for the first time in 43 years. They would follow up this impressive performance with a much less impressive one, needing a last-minute equaliser and another comeback in extra time to defeat Lowland League side Bonnyrigg Rose Athletic in the Scottish Cup. After a couple of postponed games, Dundee made their return to league action at Gayfield Park against Arbroath. Despite an early lead, Dundee could not hold on or take their chances and had to settle for a point. The club's 8-game unbeaten run would end the following week away to Raith, with an early goal nullified in a 1–3 loss. The month was mired with pitch difficulties at Dens, with games being postponed twice.

February 
A combination of Dens Park's pitch issues and heavy snow brought on by Storm Darcy worked to postpone several games for Dundee throughout February. In their first game in three weeks, Dundee would again suffer a bad defeat, losing at home for the first time in over a year to Queen of the South. The following week, Dundee would come back from behind twice against Morton to take a point at Cappielow.

March 
Dundee would begin March by earning their first league win in 2 months at home to Inverness Caledonian Thistle. They would fall to Hearts at Tynecastle Park the following Saturday. They would fire back to life next week, getting their first clean sheet since December with a 2–0 win at home to Arbroath. Once again however, any hope of consistency was dashed in a thoroughly unimpressive 1–3 defeat at home to Ayr United. They would be able to redeem that performance after just 3 days, getting their second away league win of the season at Recreation Park with a very comfortable win over bottom side Alloa Athletic. Dundee would get consecutive wins in dramatic fashion the following week, coming back from an early 0–2 deficit to defeat play-off rivals Dunfermline Athletic.

April 
The side would start the month with a defeat to St Johnstone that would knock them out of the Scottish Cup. They would quickly shake this off and get some revenge against Ayr United with a strong 0–3 win at Somerset Park. Their positive momentum stalled once again however, with a very late equaliser being needed to take a point at home against Morton. The stalling of momentum continued the following Tuesday with their first goalless draw in 13 months away at East End Park. The side could not take advantage of two Inverness CT players being sent off, with a late goal chopped off and a later one needed to scrape a draw. The Dees would however get an important victory at Dens against Raith Rovers to ensure their place in the Premiership play-offs and give them one last chance at finishing in 2nd. In the final game of the league campaign, a comfortable win courtesy of a Jason Cummings brace and a defeat for Raith allowed Dundee to sneak into 2nd place.

May 
In the first leg in the Premiership play-off semi-finals, Dundee enjoyed a strong victory at Stark's Park against Raith, taking a 0–3 lead into the second leg. In a nervy affair, Dundee would lose the second leg but were able to go through to the play-off final on aggregate. In the first leg of the final, Dundee would take a lead in the fixture with a 2–1 win over Kilmarnock at Dens, in front of home fans for the first time in 14 months. They would have a similarly exceptional performance at Rugby Park, relegating Kilmarnock and confirming their return to the Scottish Premiership after two years.

Competitions 
   

All times are in British Summer Time (BST).

Pre-season and friendlies

Scottish Championship 

Dundee will compete against Alloa Athletic, Arbroath, Ayr United, Dunfermline Athletic, Greenock Morton, Heart of Midlothian, Inverness Caledonian Thistle, Queen of the South, and Raith Rovers in the 2020–21 Championship campaign. They will play each team three times, playing five teams once at home and twice away, and the other four twice at home and once away.

League Table

Results by round

Premiership play-offs 

As they finished 2nd place in the league, Dundee would enter the Premiership play-offs in the semi-final stages.

Semi-final

Final

Scottish Cup 

Dundee entered the competition in the 2nd round. The tournament was suspended on 11 January 2021 due to the lockdown restrictions. After being allowed to continue, updated fixture dates were announced on 3 March.

Scottish League Cup

Group stage

Knockout stage 

Notes

Group B table

Squad statistics 

 

|-
|colspan="14"|Players away from the club on loan:

|-
|colspan="14"|Players who left the club during the season:

|}

Transfers

Summer window

Players in

Players out

Winter window

Players in

Players out

See also 

 List of Dundee F.C. seasons

References

Dundee F.C. seasons
Dundee